is a Japanese retired football player.

Club statistics
Updated to 23 February 2018.

References

External links

Profile at Tochigi SC

1983 births
Living people
Hiroshima Shudo University alumni
Association football people from Hiroshima Prefecture
Japanese footballers
J1 League players
J2 League players
Sanfrecce Hiroshima players
Tokushima Vortis players
Montedio Yamagata players
Yokohama FC players
Tochigi SC players
FC Ryukyu players
Association football defenders